Lindsey Jerman (23 April 1915 – 15 January 1996) was an English cricketer. He played for Essex between 1950 and 1951.

References

External links

1915 births
1996 deaths
English cricketers
Essex cricketers
Sportspeople from Peterborough
Cambridgeshire cricketers